Barkhausen is a German surname. Notable people with the surname include:

 David N. Barkhausen (born 1950), American politician and lawyer
 Heinrich Barkhausen (1881–1956), German physicist born at Bremen 
 Louis Henry Barkhausen (1877–1962), stamp collector of Chicago, Illinois

See also
 Barkhausen effect, the discontinuous change of magnetization in a ferromagnetic material when the applied magnetic field is changed
 Barkhausen stability criterion, in electronic circuits
 Barkhausen–Kurz tube, electronic vacuum tube oscillator

German-language surnames